Richard Michael Blitt is a Canadian-born screenwriter, film director, producer, and actor who has been based in Los Angeles since 1994.

Early in his career, Blitt was a writer on The Jeff Foxworthy Show and Politically Incorrect with Bill Maher. He was one of the original writers on Family Guy, where he would go on to become a producer and write several episodes. He also appeared as an actor in Family Guy'''s first ever live action sequence alongside Alyssa Milano.

He co-wrote and starred in a Fox pilot in 2003 called Blitt Happens, starring Jim Parsons, and directed by The Farrelly Brothers.

He created and was the executive producer of The Winner, starring Rob Corddry for Fox. He also created the series, Romantically Challenged'', re-teaming with its star Alyssa Milano on ABC.

Ricky has been a series regular and writer for the Peter Farrelly-Bobby Mort created comedy Loudermilk for the past three seasons on the Audience network.

In film, Blitt won a Perspectives of the Media award for his screenplay for Fox Searchlight's The Ringer. Blitt made his directing debut with his recent film Hit By Lightning, starring Jon Cryer.

Blitt also owns a production company, Candy Bar Productions.

Personal life
Blitt was raised in Côte Saint-Luc, Quebec, a municipality on the Island of Montreal. He is a graduate of McGill University and attended the AFI Conservatory. His older brother is magazine illustrator Barry Blitt. He is Jewish.

References

External links

Living people
Year of birth missing (living people)
Anglophone Quebec people
Canadian expatriate writers in the United States
People from Côte Saint-Luc
AFI Conservatory alumni
McGill University alumni
Canadian television writers
Canadian male television writers
20th-century Canadian screenwriters
20th-century Canadian male writers
21st-century Canadian screenwriters
21st-century Canadian male writers
20th-century Canadian Jews
21st-century Canadian Jews